William James Crawford was a notable sports photographer.

His early work included the official photographer of the 1906-07 South Africa rugby union tour to Britain.

He was the official club photographer of Tottenham Hotspur F.C. from 1919 until the 1936–37 seasons during which time he published a series of postcard team groups.

Year of birth missing
Year of death missing
British photojournalists
Sports photographers